Oleg Leonidovich Kryzhanovsky (28 May 1918, Ekaterinburg – 15 June 1997) was a Soviet entomologist who specialised in Coleoptera especially Carabidae and Histeridae.
Kryzhanovsky published more than 250 scientific works including 6 monographs (for list see External Link). He described 135 new species of beetles.

References
Anonym 2000 [Kryzhanovskij, O. L.] Trudy Russk. ent. Obsc. 71 54-55, Portr. (Caricature) 
Medvedev, G. S.; Korotyaev, B. A. & Tanasijtschuk, V. N. 1998 [Kryzhanovskij, O. L.] Entomologitscheskoje Obozrenije 77(1) 250-257. Portrait
Turin, H.; Penev, L. & Casale, A. [Hrsg.] 2003 The Genus Carabus in Europe. A Synthesis. Sofia-Moscow, Pensoft Publishers : XV+1-511 p. [V].

External links
 ZinRus

1918 births
1997 deaths

Soviet entomologists